The Edward A. Brackett House is a historic octagon house at 290 Highland Avenue in Winchester, Massachusetts.  Built in the early 1850s by sculptor Edward Augustus Brackett, and based on popular plans described by Orson Squire Fowler, it is Winchester's only octagonal house.  The house was listed on the National Register of Historic Places in 1989.

Description and history
The Brackett House is set back from the east side of Highland Avenue, a north–south route through the east side of Winchester.  The house, as built in the early 1850s, is a distinctive design made by Brackett, an eccentric artist and naturalist, that adhered fairly closely to recommendations of Orson Squire Fowler in the first edition of The Octagon House: A Home for All, the work which set off a brief period of interest in those houses.  It consisted of a series of four interlocking octagons, with varying heights and roof lines to create interesting visual effects.  A fifth octagonal unit was added by Brackett in c. 1900 which added a shed space on the first floor and a bedroom on the second, along with a veranda.  The building was originally finished in vertical board-and-batten siding and trimmed with then-fashionable Italianate brackets under its eaves, but these features were removed during the 1900 renovations, and the building exterior was redone in stucco.

Edward A. Brackett

Edward Brackett was a distinctive local personality, trained as a sculptor but also a poet and conservationist.  He established a fish hatchery nearby, and ran a commercial nursery.  He lived in the house until his death in 1908.

See also
List of octagon houses
National Register of Historic Places listings in Winchester, Massachusetts

References

Houses on the National Register of Historic Places in Winchester, Massachusetts
Octagon houses in Massachusetts
Houses in Winchester, Massachusetts
Houses completed in 1850